is a Japanese judoka.

Abe rose to prominence after becoming Youth Olympic champion in 2014.  He won the Tokyo Grand Slam later that year, at just 17-years-old, beating then-World Champion Masashi Ebinuma. He was the silver medalist at the junior World Championships in Fort Lauderdale.

Abe is the current national half-lightweight champion at the All-Japan Judo Championships and won the gold medal in the 66 kg competition at the 2020 Olympics held in Tokyo, Japan.

Early life
Abe began training judo in 2003, at the age of 6, in his hometown of Kōbe in Hyōgo prefecture. He began competing in elementary school. His father, Koji, is a firefighter at the Kobe City Fire Department. He was often thrown by Nami Nabekura when they were in elementary school. He said, "such an experience made me what I am". His name in kanji reads, "one, two, three".

Abe won his first national tournament while attending Kobe Ikuta junior high school, winning in the under 55 kg category. He then embarked on his junior career while attending Shinko Gakuen Shinko high school. While still a high school student, he had won the national Inter-High School championships multiple times. He graduated in 2016. Abe is presently training at the Nittadai. He has been coached by Atsushi Nobukawa since elementary school.

His sister, Uta Abe, is the youngest circuit winner in IJF history.

Career

Junior career: 2012–2014

Cadet and high school competitions
Abe had won several competitions as a cadet including the Asian U17 Championships in 2012, and the European Cup Cadets in 2012.

The World Cadet Championships in Miami was Abe's first high-level international tournament. He reached the final, meeting Georgia's Koba Mchedishvili, and lost by ippon, settling for silver. The tournament was held on Abe's 16th birthday.

Abe defeated the son of Japanese legend Toshihiko Koga, Hayato, at the 2015 Inter-High School Championships.

2014 All-Japan Junior Championships
The junior national tournament was held in Saitama. Abe defeated Takamasa Sueki in the final.

2014 Youth Olympic Games
Abe transitioned from cadet to junior level at the Youth Olympics in Nanjing. He played ippon judo throughout the tournament, and defeated Ukraine's Bogdav Iadov by waza-ari using sode tsurikomi goshi, and then seoi nage for ippon, securing a gold medal for Japan. Both throws that were showcased in the final are his favourite techniques.

2014 World Junior Championships
Abe was a favourite coming into the 2014 World Junior Championships in Fort Lauderdale. He was one of the few youth Olympic champions in the tournament.

En route to the final, he defeated all his opponents by ippon in two and a half minutes or less, with the exception of future World Champion An Baul in Round 2. They were separated by a single shido.

In the final, Abe was against Russia's Egor Mgdsyan. Abe was ahead in the first two and a half minutes, scoring a waza-ari and a yuko. However, Mgdsyan managed to gain two waza-aris in just 45 seconds, effectively securing ippon and defeating Abe, leaving the latter to settle for silver.

Senior career

Rise to prominence and transition to senior level: 2014 Kodokan Cup and Grand Slam 

Abe rose to national prominence at the Kodokan Cup, his first senior tournament, where he became the youngest winner at 16-years-old, and the first high school student to win the Cup in ten years since Satoshi Ishii in 2004. His win was a surprise, especially in the third round when he defeated Masaaki Fukuoka in less than two minutes by ippon, with an uki otoshi. He defeated Yuki Nishiyama in the final.

Abe transitioned to senior level internationally at the Grand Slam in Tokyo, one of the most prestigious and high-level tournaments of the IJF circuit. It was his first time being officially coached by a national team coach, namely legendary heavyweight Keiji Suzuki.

Abe dominated his opening fight against Peru's Alonso Wong, scoring a waza-ari and pinning with a kesa-gatame for ippon. He also won his second fight by ippon.

Abe won grand slam Tokyo December 2016 in 66 kg.

Following his second fight, Abe found himself facing tough opponents, amongst who were two world champions. He competed against five-time World Championships medalist and 2009 World Champion Georgii Zantaraia in the quarter-final, and surprisingly managed to score a waza-ari. Abe tried to pin Zantaraia, however the latter escaped. Abe was nevertheless through to a semi-final match up against triple and reigning World Champion, fellow Japanese Masashi Ebinuma.

Ebinuma scored a yuko in 30 seconds, and looked to be winning the bout. However, Abe almost threw Ebinuma for a score twice, but was unable to due to the senior's solid defense. Abe then caused an upset by scoring waza-ari in the last minute with ushiro goshi, defeating Ebinuma and reaching the final.

In the final, Abe faced Israel's Golan Pollack. Abe scored a yuko with an ouchi gari, and Pollack landed on his side outside the mat, hitting his head on the barrier. Abe then attempted to pin him, and Pollack was unable to escape, possibly ending the bout with a win to Abe, but was voided by the referee as the second skill was out of play. There were no scores after that, therefore crowning Abe as the winner of the tournament.

2015 Grand Prix Düsseldorf
Abe competed in his first tournament of the year at the 2015 Grand Prix in Düsseldorf. He struggled in his first fight, scraping through by yuko. In the second round, Abe defeated the Netherlands' Junior Degen by ippon using his favourite ashi waza, ouchi gari.

Abe then faced Asian Games champion Davaadorjiin Tömörkhüleg in the third round, and was defeated by waza-ari, ending his tournament.

2015 Grand Prix Ulaanbaatar
Abe then returned to the tour at the Grand Prix in Ulaanbaatar. Abe's first fight was against Georgia's Masha Margvelashvili. Abe won by two waza-aris, the first of which using kosoto gari and the second using his main skill sode tsurikomi goshi. He then faced Mongolia's Batgerel Battsetseg, and won by ippon and yuko.

Abe faced budding rival Tomorkhuleg in the final, and scored first for a waza-ari, however was defeated by ippon in the final minute when Tomorkhuleg threw him using kosoto gari.

2015 All-Japan Championships
The All-Japan Championships in Fukuoka was Abe's first senior national championships. It was his final year competing nationally as a high school student.

Abe defeated Yuki Hashiguchi by shido in his first fight, then subsequently lost to Kengo Takaichi in just a minute and half when Takaichi pinned him using ushiro-kesa-gatame for ippon, leaving him to settle for a bronze medal.

2015 Kodokan Cup
Abe competed in his second Kodokan Cup and entered as the defending champion. However, Abe looked off-form, not scoring a single point until the bronze medal match, where he used osoto gari and kosoto gari for an awasete ippon. His bid to defend his title failed in the third round when eventual finalist Joshiro Maruyama scored a yuko with tomoe nage. According to Abe, he felt that with this tournament loss, he would be unable to qualify for the 2016 Olympics.

Continued successes and first national title: Grand Prix Tashkent and 2016 All-Japan Championships
Abe played all-ippon judo for the first time in a senior tournament at the Grand Prix in Tashkent. In his first fight, he defeated Turkey's Sinan Sandal by ippon, again using his main ashi waza, ouchi gari. He then defeated local Dostonjon Holikulov using a powerful double sleeve grip osoto gari for ippon.

In the quarter-final, Abe faced France's Alexandre Mariac, and scored a yuko using sode-tsurikomi-goshi. He sealed his win using tai otoshi for waza-ari, and connecting to pin Mariac with kesa-gatame for ippon.

Abe then had another versatility showcase in the semi-final against Mongolia's Altansukh Dovdon. Abe scored a yuko in just 17 seconds, and then scored a waza-ari with tai otoshi. He then attempted to pin Dovdon, but was unsuccessful. Abe scored another yuko with his signature skill drop seoi nage, and again attempted to pin, but his leg was latched on by Dovdon. He scored ippon with a second drop seoi nage and sealed his win.

Abe defeated China's Ma Duanbin with another powerful double sleeve grip osoto gari to end the fight in just 36 seconds by ippon, becoming tournament champion.

In his first tournament of 2016, and the first as a university student, Abe competed at his second All-Japan Championships. He looked to be on form and reached the semi-final, where he met budding rival Ebinuma. It was a critical match as the national championships also serves as a potential qualifier for the Olympics in Rio de Janeiro, and both were potential contenders as Japan's half-lightweight representative.

Abe was the first to attempt a skill, and managed to throw Ebinuma with sode-tsurikomi-goshi, but was unable to gain a score. Abe again attempted a skill, and this time was successful with osoto gari. He then connected to kesa gatame to pin Ebinuma, but the senior was able to escape before an ippon could be achieved, but scoring a waza-ari. Abe then threw Ebinuma again with sode-tsurikomi-goshi, initially scoring another waza-ari for ippon, but was voided by the referees. Abe again attempted a back throw, and was successful for a waza-ari, sending him through to the final and causing an upset.

With Ebinuma watching from the sidelines, Abe faced Maruyama in the final. The fight was very close, and both were level with a shido each, sending the match to golden score. After nearly two minutes, a second shido was awarded to Maruyama, earning Abe his first national title.

Injury and failure to qualify for the 2016 Olympics

Abe planned to compete at the 2016 Asian Championships, but was sidelined with a knee ligament injury. It was reported he needed at least three weeks of recovery time.

Abe is currently ranked 25th in the second last IJF World Rankings before the Olympics, and only the top 22 would be able to qualify. He is also the fourth Japanese in the rankings. With head coach Inoue recalling Ebinuma for his second Olympics as Japan's half-lightweight representative, Abe officially did not qualify.

Abe has been chosen as an ambassador for the 2020 Tokyo Olympics.

Return to IJF circuit and continued undefeated record in Grand Slams: 2016 Tyumen and Tokyo
Abe entered the Grand Slam in Tyumen as the number one seed, and was considered favourite for gold. He was coached by Yusuke Kanamaru and Keiji Suzuki from the sidelines.

The competition was vacated by majority of top 30 fighters, being only 20 days before the Olympics. With the small number of fighters, Abe fought in the quarter-final against Azerbaijan's Iskandar Talishinski. He opened his first bout on fire, throwing Talishinski with his signature ouchi gari for waza-ari. He then scored another waza-ari for awasete ippon with a powerful seoi otoshi.

Abe faced teammate Sho Tateyama in an All-Japan semi-final. He threw Tateyama for waza-ari with deashi barai and earned several shidos, but continued on to the final with the former unable to score any throws. He met local Anzaur Ardanov in the final, and threw him for waza-ari with a solid osoto gari. Abe earned his first Grand Slam title since 2014.

Abe entered the Grand Slam in Tokyo following senior and rival Ebinuma's absence as the top ranked half-lightweight from Japan. An and Basile, who were largely considered the favourites as finalists at the 2016 Olympics, also competed. Abe faced Japanese-based Korean Kim Limhwan in his first fight and scored a waza-ari with an ippon seoi nage. He then tried to connect with osaekomi waza but was unsuccessful. Abe finally sealed the fight with ippon with a phenomenal single sleeve grip sode-tsurikomi-goshi.

In his second fight, Abe was against Russia's Mikhail Pulyaev. Abe played with one of his most used ashi waza ouchi gari for a waza-ari. No throws were scored after that, sending Abe to the semi-final against countryman Norihito Isoda. It was a fierce fight for grips, with Abe being penalised twice with shido. He attempted a seoi nage which was initially scored an ippon but then relegated to a waza-ari. However, it was enough to send him to the final.

He faced another countryman in Yuuki Hashiguchi. It was another aggressive grip fight, but Abe had the upper hand with another seoi nage attempt, scoring a yuko. Abe followed with an osoto gari but Hashiguchi was able to escape the attack. Abe then won his second Grand Slam in Tokyo with a stunning tai otoshi for ippon. Abe was considered as a major contender at the World Championships following his win, as well as one of judo's top half-lightweights.

Tokyo Olympics
In 2021, Abe won the gold medal at the 2020 Olympics on the same day that his younger sister Uta won the gold medal in her judo division.

Return to IJF World Tour and The 2022 Tashkent World Championships
Abe Hifumi returned to the IJF World Tour on 8 July 2022 winning the Budapest Grand Slam. After the Grand Slam, he competed in the World Judo Championships in Tashkent on 7 October. He won five fights, including semi-final against the world number one Denis Vieru and the final against his country-man Joshiro Maruyama with an ashi-waza footsweep.

Fighting style
Abe is known for a more modern style of Japanese judo, like fellow lightweight and World Champion Naohisa Takato. He is right-handed. A seoi nage and sode-tsurikomi-goshi specialist, he is aggressive, physical and dynamic with his fighting, often preferring a fast pace of judo, with an average winning time of two and half minutes. He prefers a double sleeve grip when executing throws. Abe often connects skills using ashi waza like osoto gari and ouchi gari to set up his nage waza, and also uses osoto gari and ouchi gari as a lone skill for ippon.

Japanese legend and current head coach Kōsei Inoue has described him as, "way beyond his years... I'm looking forward to how much he can compete nationally and internationally."

Abe considers Tadahiro Nomura as his favourite fighter and main influence in his judo.

Competitive record

(does not include Youth Olympic Games and national tournaments)

Medals

2014
 All-Japan Junior Championships
 Youth Olympic Games
 World Junior Championships
 Kodokan Cup
 Grand Slam, Tokyo
2015
 Grand Prix Ulaanbaatar
 All-Japan Championships
 Kodokan Cup
 Grand Prix, Tashkent
2016
 All-Japan Championships
 Grand Slam, Tyumen
 Grand Slam, Tokyo
2017
 Grand Slam, Paris
 2017 World Judo Championships, Budapest
 Grand Prix, Tokyo
2018
 Grand Prix, Yekaterinburg
 Grand Prix, Zagreb
 2018 World Judo Championships, Baku
 Grand Slam, Osaka
2021
 Olympic Games −66 kg, Tokyo

See also
List of Youth Olympic Games gold medalists who won Olympic gold medals

References

External links
 
 
 
 
 

Japanese male judoka
Sportspeople from Kobe
1997 births
Judoka at the 2014 Summer Youth Olympics
Judoka at the 2020 Summer Olympics
Living people
World judo champions
Youth Olympic gold medalists for Japan
Olympic gold medalists for Japan
Olympic silver medalists for Japan
Medalists at the 2020 Summer Olympics
Olympic judoka of Japan
Olympic medalists in judo
21st-century Japanese people